The Ministry of Trade, Investment and Enterprise of the Sakha Republic (Yakutia) is a regional government regulator and policy maker in the Sakha Republic, Russia. It is responsible for regulating and forming policies related to socioeconomic and business development in the Sakha Republic.

History 
The Ministry was established by the Government of the Sakha Republic in December 2016 as key economic modernization regulator and policy maker focused on increasing trade activity with Asia-Pacific and investment in all sectors of economy with particular emphasis on digitization, innovation, renewable energy, sustainable resource development and transport infrastructure. In January 2017, the Head of the Sakha Republic at the time, Yegor Borisov, appointed Anton Safronov to lead this newly-established Ministry.

References

2016 establishments in Russia
Ministries established in 2016
Politics of the Sakha Republic
Government ministries of the Sakha Republic
Sakha